Angelo Guatta (August 5, 1907 – October 9, 1993, New Jersey) was an Italian racing driver. Besides racing the 1932 24 Hours of Le Mans and the Circuito del Sud in 1930, Guatta entered the Mille Miglia seven times between 1928 and 1938. In all his races he used an Alfa Romeo 6C or 8C.

Complete results

References 

1907 births
1993 deaths
Italian racing drivers
24 Hours of Le Mans drivers
Mille Miglia drivers